Andrej Martin won the first edition of the event by defeating Adrian Mannarino 4–6, 6–4, 6–1 in the final.

Seeds

Draw

Finals

Top half

Bottom half

References
 Main Draw
 Qualifying Draw

Copa Internacional de Tenis Total Digest - Singles
2013 Singles